Anthostomella is a genus of fungi in the family Xylariaceae.
The ascomata are simple and contain only a single perithecium.

Species
Species include:
 Anthostomella limitata
 Anthostomella pullulans

References

External links
Index Fungorum

Xylariales